The 1981 Calgary Stampeders finished in 5th place in the West Division with a 6–10 record and failed to make the playoffs.

Regular season

Season Standings

Season schedule

Awards and records

1981 CFL All-Stars
DB – Ray Odums, CFL All-Star

Western All-Stars
DB – Ray Odums, CFL Western All-Star
DB – Merv Walker, CFL Western All-Star

References

Calgary Stampeders seasons
1981 Canadian Football League season by team